The 1997 Historic Formula One Championship (also known as Thoroughbred Grand Prix) was the third season of the Historic Formula One Championship. It began at Silverstone on May 5 and ended at Brands Hatch on October 19.

It was won by Bob Berridge driving a RAM 01.

Calendar

References

Historic Formula One Championship
1997 in motorsport